The Charles D. McLaughlin House is located in the Gold Coast Historic District of Midtown Omaha, Nebraska. Designed in the Colonial Revival Style by noted Omaha architect John McDonald, it was built in 1905. The City of Omaha designated it an Omaha Landmark on March 16, 1982, and it was listed on the National Register of Historic Places in November of that same year.

References

External links

 McLaughlin House photo

Houses on the National Register of Historic Places in Omaha, Nebraska
Omaha Landmarks
Houses completed in 1905
1905 establishments in Nebraska